The Wrightspeed X1 is a one-off Ariel Atom heavily modified to use an all-electric powertrain. The Atom was chosen for its light weight and efficient design.   The electric motor and inverter are sourced from AC Propulsion, makers of the TZero concept car, while the batteries are low weight, high energy density lithium ion provided from A123 Systems. As with the Atom the transmission is a Honda unit, but stripped of its shifting mechanism and other parts to provide only the second gear speed, allowed by the wide speed and torque range available from the electric motor.

Built by San Francisco-based New Zealand engineer Ian Wright, the X1 created a stir when it bested several sports cars in a drag race, including a Carrera GT (even with a rolling start, an advantage for the gas burning vehicles), all while being filmed by local news station KRON 4. Despite the impressive performance, the vehicle is intended only as a proof of concept.  Future production is planned; however, according to the website, "... the production car will be quite different, since it will meet the safety standards, which the prototype does not. It will, however, be at least as quick as the prototype.".  Mr. Wright was a co-founder of electric-car company Tesla Motors, but has since left to pursue his own ideas.

Performance 

  2.9 seconds
 Standing  11.6 seconds
 Top speed  (electronically limited)
 Charger: onboard conductive. Input 100–250 V 50 or 60 Hz
 Current: user adjustable up to 80 A

The X1 prototype (various technical images) 

Most of these images are applicable to the Ariel Atom

See also
 Ariel Atom
 La Jamais Contente
 AC Propulsion tzero
 Keio University Eliica
 Lightning GT
 Tesla Roadster (2008)
 Think Global AS
 Venturi Fétish

References

External links

 Wrightspeed
 Drag race: Wrightspeed X1 vs. Carrera GT, vs. Ferrari 360 and vs. AC Propulsion tZero
  Video of Wrightspeed X1 electric car beating a Ferrari 360 Spider and a Porsche Carrera GT
  Video of Wrightspeed X1' test-drive in San Francisco
  Video of X1 vs. a Lamborghini and a NASCAR race car with technological review
  Video: Wrightspeed's X1 electric prototype zips around the race track and blows past a Tesla Roadster

Roadsters
Concept cars
Electric sports cars
Electric concept cars